Neofolk, also known as apocalyptic folk, is a form of experimental music blending elements of folk and industrial music, which emerged in punk rock circles in the 1980s. Neofolk may either be solely acoustic or combine acoustic folk instrumentation with various other sounds.

History

The term "neofolk" originates from esoteric music circles who started using the term in the late 20th century to describe music influenced by musicians such as Douglas Pearce (Death In June), Tony Wakeford (Sol Invictus), and David Tibet (Current 93).

Anglo-American folk music with similar sounds and themes to neofolk existed as far back as the 1960s. Folk musicians such as Vulcan's Hammer, Changes, Leonard Cohen, and Comus could be considered harbingers of the sound that later influenced the neofolk artists. Also the later explorations of Velvet Underground's band members, specifically those of Nico, have been called a major influence on what later became neofolk.

Culture
A majority of artists within the neofolk genre use archaic, cultural and literary references. Local traditions and indigenous beliefs tend to be portrayed heavily as well as esoteric and historical topics. Various forms of neopaganism and occultism play a part in the themes touched upon by many modern and original neofolk artists. Runic alphabets, heathen European sites and other means of expressing an interest in the ancient and ancestral occur often in neofolk music. The sociologist Peter Webb describes this as a legacy from romantic poetry and a reaction against the rationalism of the Enlightenment. Webb writes that for bands like Sol Invictus, this leads to "a type of esoteric spirituality where paganism comes to the fore because of its respect for nature, its openness about sexuality, and its rituals and ceremonies guided by the seasons". Aesthetically, references to this subject occur within band names, album artwork, clothing and various other means of artistic expression. This has led to some forefathers of the genre and current artists within the genre attributing it to being an aspect of a broader neopagan revival. David Tibet of Current 93, one of the most influential neofolk bands, regards himself as a Christian, but believes that truth always is hidden and is more interested in apocalyptic and apocryphal literature than any Christian canon. During a period of heavy amphetamine and LSD use in the 1980s, he began to revere the children's character Noddy as a Gnostic deity.

Many bands use metaphors, sometimes borrowing terms such as Ernst Jünger's Waldgänger and using fascist symbols and slogans, which has led to an association of the genre with the far-right, though this is contested by fans. References to occult, pagan and politically far-right figures and movement are often intentionally ambiguous. Stefanie von Schnurbein has described the genre's approach to these types of material as an "elitist Nietzschean masquerade" which expresses a "(neo-)romantic art-religious attitude". Some bands have stated opposition to the perceived fascist apologia and themes in the genre and the related genre of martial industrial.

Related terms and styles

Apocalyptic folk
As a descriptor, apocalyptic folk predates neofolk and was used by David Tibet to describe the music of his band Current 93 during a period in the late 1980s and early 1990s. Initially, Tibet did not intend to imply connection with the folk music genre; rather, that Current 93 was made by "apocalyptic folk[s]": in other words, apocalyptic people. Tibet and Current 93 produced some covers of traditional English folk songs, and Tibet himself was a great advocate for reclusive English folk singer Shirley Collins.

Folk noir

Other vague terms sometimes used to describe artists of this genre include "dark folk" and "pagan folk". These terms are umbrella terms that also describe various other forms of unrelated music.

Martial industrial

Martial industrial or military pop is a genre that shares a lot in common with neofolk and developed very close to it.

References

Citations

Sources

Further reading
 
 
 
 Shekhovtsov, Anton. 'Apoliteic music: Neo-Folk, Martial Industrial and "metapolitical fascism"', Patterns of Prejudice, Vol. 43, No. 5 (December 2009), pp. 431–457.

 
English styles of music